GWD may refer to:

Biology and medicine
 Alpha-glucan, water dikinase
 Guinea worm disease

Transport
 Gwadar International Airport, Balochistan, Pakistan
 Greenwood station (Mississippi), United States

Other uses
 Gawwada language, spoken in Ethiopia
 Global Wind Day, celebrating wind power